John Byer (20 September 1903 – 11 August 1988) was a Barbadian cricketer. He played in six first-class matches for the Barbados cricket team from 1929 to 1936.

See also
 List of Barbadian representative cricketers

References

External links
 

1903 births
1988 deaths
Barbadian cricketers
Barbados cricketers
People from Saint George, Barbados